Mohammed Al-Shanqiti may refer to:
 Mohammed Al-Shanqiti (cyclist)
 Mohammed Al-Shanqiti (footballer)